Zamioculcas is a genus of flowering plants in the family Araceae, containing the single species Zamioculcas zamiifolia. It is a tropical perennial plant, native to eastern Africa, from southern Kenya to northeastern South Africa. Common names include Zanzibar gem, ZZ plant, Zuzu plant, aroid palm, eternity plant and emerald palm. It is grown as an ornamental plant, mainly for its attractive glossy foliage and easy care.

Dutch nurseries started wide-scale, commercial propagation of the plant around 1996. It was first described as Caladium zamiifolium by Loddiges in 1829, but moved to his new genus Zamioculcas by Heinrich Wilhelm Schott and given its established name, Zamioculcas zamiifolia, by Adolf Engler.

The roots of the plants are rhizomatous and have the ability to store moisture, thus aiding the plants in their drought resistance. For this reason, the plant should be watered only when it is dry, to avoid overwatering. A commonly-held notion among gardeners is “If you water the ZZ plant more than you pay your rent, it’s too much”  (I.e.; once a month, possibly twice, watering is more than sufficient). They also require superior drainage, with lots of chunky, rocky and inert materials mixed into their soil. They’re known to survive in relatively dark, indoor areas of homes and buildings, and can live in full shade to indirect sunlight. However, lower light is not optimal in most cases; insufficient amounts of sunlight can result in leaves lengthening and/or falling off, yellowing (chlorosis), and generally uneven or disproportionate growth (as the plant stretches towards a light source).

Etymology
The botanical name Zamioculcas derives from, on the one hand, the superficial similarity of its foliage to that of the cycad genus Zamia; on the other hand, its kinship to the fellow Araceae genus Colocasia, whose name comes from the word “” or “” (in an ancient Middle Eastern dialect), and which is named qolqas in Arabic. Botanical synonyms include Caladium zamiaefolium, Zamioculcas loddigesii and Z. lanceolata.

Cultivars 

Zamioculcas zamiifolia 'HANSOTI13,' commercially known as 'Zenzi' 
Zamioculcas zamiifolia 'Dowon,' commercially known under Costa Farm's trademark 'Raven'   
Zamioculcas zamiifolia 'Super Nova'

Description
It is normally evergreen, but becomes deciduous during drought, surviving drought due to the large potato-like rhizome that stores water until rainfall resumes. The stems of these pinnate leaves are thickened at the bottom.

Zamioculcas zamiifolia contains an unusually high water contents of leaves (91%) and petioles (95%) and has an individual leaf longevity of at least six months, which may be the reason it can survive extremely well under interior low light levels for four months without water.

Cultivation

In temperate regions, it is grown as a houseplant. Overwatering may destroy this plant through tuber rot. Bright, indirect light is best: some sun will be tolerated.

Zamioculcas zamiifolia may be propagated by leaf cuttings: typically, the lower ends of detached leaves are inserted into a moist gritty compost and the pot enclosed in a polythene bag. Though the leaves may well decay, succulent bulb-like structures should form in the compost and these may be potted up to produce new plants. The process may take upwards of one year. The plant can also be propagated by division. The plant impresses especially by the thick, dark green, shiny leaves. Due to its strong green leaves, it is especially suitable for open, bright rooms.

Usage in traditional medicine
Though little information is available, Z. zamiifolia is apparently used medicinally in the Mulanje District of Malawi and in the East Usambara mountains of Tanzania where juice from the leaves is used to treat earache.

In Tanzania a poultice of bruised plant material from Z. zamiifolia is used as a treatment of the inflammatory condition known as "mshipa".

Roots from Z. zamiifolia are used as a local application to treat ulceration by the Sukuma people in north-western Tanzania.

Chemicals
Zamioculcas zamiifolia contains acylated C-glycosylflavone apigenin 6-C-(6″-O-(3-hydroxy-3-methylglutaroyl)- β-glucopyranoside)

Air purification
A 2014 study from the Department of Plant and Environmental Science at the University of Copenhagen shows that, in a laboratory setting, the plant is able to remove volatile organic compounds in this order of effectiveness: benzene, toluene, ethylbenzene and xylene at a molar flux of around 0.01 mol/(m2 day). The same study stated that any effectiveness on indoor environments is inconclusive.

Toxicity
Zamioculcas zamiifolia is part of the family Araceae, which includes many poisonous genera, such as Philodendron, Monstera,  Anthurium, Dieffenbachia, Aglaonema  and  Spathiphyllum, all of which contain insoluble calcium oxalate.

An initial toxicological experiment, conducted by the University of Bergen in 2015, on extracts from Z. zamiifolia (using brine shrimp as a lethality assay) did not indicate lethality to the shrimp, even at concentrations of extracts up to 1 mg/mL. The scientists conducting the experiment observed that, "…On the contrary, it could appear as though the extract contributed to improvements in the vitality of the larvae".

References

External links
 
 

Monotypic Araceae genera
Flora of Africa
House plants
Succulent plants
Araceae
Low light plants